Roger Norman Freeman, Baron Freeman, PC (born 27 May 1942), is a British politician. A member of the Conservative Party, he served as Chancellor of the Duchy of Lancaster in the Cabinet of Prime Minister John Major from 1995 to 1997. He was a Member of Parliament (MP) representing the constituency of Kettering from 1983 to 1997, and was made a life peer in 1997.

Early life and career 
Freeman was born in the Wirral, and educated at Whitgift School, Croydon, and Balliol College, Oxford. When he was at Oxford, he was the President of the Oxford University Conservative Association in Hilary Term 1964. Before entering Parliament, he was a Chartered Accountant working for an investment bank.

Political career
After an unsuccessful attempt to be elected as MP for Don Valley in 1979, Freeman was finally elected as MP for Kettering in 1983. Before joining the Cabinet, he served as Parliamentary Under Secretary of State for the Armed Forces (1986–88), Parliamentary Under Secretary of State for Health (1988–90), and Minister for Public Transport (1990–1995) ranking as Minister of State. In that post he was responsible for steering through the House of Commons the Railways Bill, providing for the privatisation of British Rail and enacted as the Railways Act 1993.

In the 1993 Birthday Honours, Freeman was sworn of the Privy Council.

In 1995, he was brought into the Cabinet by John Major as Chancellor of the Duchy of Lancaster. In this role, he made a ministerial visit to Lancaster Royal Grammar School in 1995.

He also inaugurated the process of privatisation of HM Stationery Office (HMSO), though as a former minister for MOD Procurement, one of HMSO's major customers, he could be adjudged to have had a conflict of interest. He therefore misjudged the effect of privatisation on HMSO, which, rather than preserve the business as a whole, and protecting jobs, hastened the already-established process of splitting the business into its various parts, resulting in the destruction of some, and the sale of others to foreign owners. The loss of jobs has been massive. The National Audit Office later denounced the whole process as a debacle. It could be argued that he, along with his colleague Lord North in the other place, may have misled the house.

He did his best to make the dying days of the Major government more colourful by appearing on Channel 4's 'bottom up' television programme The People's Parliament. Appearing by video link, he was quizzed by the female Scots host on the alleged unapproachability of politicians "in grey suits". Freeman quipped: "Well, I can't just start turning up to work in a jumper!". Freeman's remark though was better-judged than any viewer might have realised at the time. The Major government's strategy weekend where Cabinet members arrived wearing jumpers was much lampooned.

Narrowly defeated in the 1997 general election, he was shortly afterwards raised to the peerage as Baron Freeman, of Dingley in the County of Northamptonshire in the 1997 Prime Minister's Resignation Honours. He sat in the House of Lords until his retirement on 1 October 2020.

Charitable Associations
Lord Freeman was the chairman of the Charity SkillForce from 2004 to 2016. He is now Patron of SkillForce and the Independent Transport Commission.

Personal life
His wife, Jennifer Freeman, is a former Secretary of the Victorian Society and is a specialist developer of architecturally historic buildings.

Arms

References

External links 
 http://www.parliament.uk/biographies/roger-freeman/26901
 
Debrett's profile

|-

1942 births
Conservative Party (UK) MPs for English constituencies
Conservative Party (UK) life peers
Life peers created by Elizabeth II
Chancellors of the Duchy of Lancaster
Living people
Members of the Privy Council of the United Kingdom
Members of the Bow Group
Presidents of the Oxford University Conservative Association
People educated at Whitgift School
UK MPs 1983–1987
UK MPs 1987–1992
UK MPs 1992–1997